Doris M. Batter-Hatton (22 April 1929 – 23 April 2002) was a British sprinter. She competed in the women's 100 metres at the 1948 Summer Olympics. She married Leonard Hatton in 1951. She represented England and won a silver medal in the 660 yards relay at the 1950 British Empire Games in Auckland, New Zealand.

References

External links
 

1929 births
2002 deaths
Athletes (track and field) at the 1948 Summer Olympics
British female sprinters
Olympic athletes of Great Britain
People from Brentford
Commonwealth Games medallists in athletics
Commonwealth Games silver medallists for England
Athletes (track and field) at the 1950 British Empire Games
Olympic female sprinters
Medallists at the 1950 British Empire Games